Sürgavere is a village in Põhja-Sakala Parish, Viljandi County in central Estonia. It has a population of 398 (as of 2009).

It has a station on the Tallinn - Viljandi railway line operated by Elron.

References

External links
 Sürgavere village association 

Villages in Viljandi County
Põhja-Sakala Parish
Kreis Fellin